Maureen O'Hara (1920–2015) was an Irish singer and actress from Dublin, who worked primarily in American film and television. She was born into a close-knit and artistically talented family; her mother was a contralto vocalist, and her three sisters and two brothers were budding actors and musical performers. O'Hara received music and dance lessons at the Ena Burke School of Elocution and Drama, becoming a member of the Rathmines Theatre Company when she was 10 years old. While still a teenager, she won several Radio Éireann Players contests to perform with them. She also won the Dublin Feis Award, for her performance as Portia in The Merchant of Venice. O’Hara was a member of the Abbey Theatre School, and a graduate of the Guildhall School of Music.

O'Hara's entry into films was the result of her and her parents meeting actor Harry Richman, who offered her a one-line part in the British comedy film Kicking the Moon Around (1938). Within the next year she had made a screen test, following which, actor Charles Laughton cast her in the role of Esmeralda in the first sound version of The Hunchback of Notre Dame (1939) for RKO Pictures. Laughton and O'Hara would work together again in Jamaica Inn (1939) for the British-based Mayflower Productions, and again at RKO for This Land Is Mine (1943).

Following Jamaica Inn, O'Hara's career floundered at RKO Pictures. Her agent Lew Wasserman got her the role of Angharad Morgan in the 20th Century Fox film adaptation of How Green Was My Valley (1941), directed by John Ford. The film won Academy Awards for Best Picture, Best Director, Best Black-and-White Cinematography, Best Black-and-White Art Direction, and Best Supporting Actor Donald Cook. The effect it had on O'Hara's career was to jumpstart her in a new direction.

From that point forward, O'Hara became an audience favorite, working with some of the most successful actors in the industry. She and John Payne co-starred in To the Shores of Tripoli (1942), Miracle on 34th Street (1947), Tripoli (1950) and Sentimental Journey (1958). Tyrone Power and she teamed up for The Black Swan (1942) and The Long Gray Line (1955). Anthony Quinn first appeared as a non-lead actor in her films The Black Swan (1942), Buffalo Bill (1944), Sinbad the Sailor (1947) and Against All Flags (1952). Quinn soon began to rise in his own career, and he and O'Hara were on equal co-star billing in The Magnificent Matador (1955). Her last film with him was Only the Lonely (1991). She also worked twice with Henry Fonda in Immortal Sergeant (1943) and Spencer's Mountain (1963). O'Hara and Brian Keith co-starred in The Deadly Companions (1961), and The Rare Breed (1966). Their film The Parent Trap (1961) grossed $29,650,385 worldwide, more than any of her other films.

Her association with Ford ultimately led to her collaborations with John Wayne, the co-star who was most linked to her in the public's perception. Together they made Rio Grande (1950), The Quiet Man (1952), The Wings of Eagles (1957), McLintock! (1963) and Big Jake (1971). The Quiet Man was her personal favorite of her entire career, and one she often referred to as "lightning in a bottle". Both the public and Wayne's children saw an on-screen rapport between them that existed with no other co-stars for either of them. The two became so identified with each other that some of the public came to mistakenly believe she and Wayne were actually married in real life. In 1976, she was a participant in the Variety Clubs International All-Star Tribute to John Wayne. On May 21, 1979, O'Hara was summoned by United States Senator Barry Goldwater to speak before a congressional committee in advance of the Congressional Gold Medal being bestowed on Wayne, who was less than a month away from his death from cancer.

With the growing television market in the 1950s and 1960s, O'Hara appeared as a guest star on numerous shows, and received a star on the Hollywood Walk of Fame on February 8, 1960. O'Hara never won an Academy Award for any individual performance, and was not even nominated as such. She was finally given an Honorary Oscar in 2014, when she was 94 years old. 

She attained US citizenship in 1946. O'Hara gradually left show business after her 1968 marriage to Charles F. Blair Jr., retired US Air Force brigadier general, former chief pilot at Pan Am and founder of the United States Virgin Islands airline Antilles Air Boats. They are buried together in Arlington National Cemetery.

Film

Television

Bibliography

References

External links

Maureen O'Hara at UCLA Film & Television Archive

Actress filmographies
Irish filmographies
American filmographies